The Koboko–Yumbe–Moyo Road is a road in the Northern Region of Uganda, connecting the towns of Koboko, Yumbe, and Moyo.

Location
The road starts at Koboko, the headquarters of the Koboko District, and continues in a northeasterly direction, through Yumbe, where the headquarters of the Yumbe District are located, ending at Moyo, where the headquarters of the Moyo District are located.

Overview
The road is a busy and important road for people and goods traveling between the town of Moyo and points south. The road corridor is the lifeline for the host and the refugee population of the districts of Moyo, Yumbe and Koboko. Uganda is host to 1.4 million refugees, the largest number on the African continent and the largest in the World. This road passes in close proximity to Bidibidi Refugee Camp, the most populous refugee settlement in Africa, Lobule Refugee Camp, and Palorinya Refugee Settlement. Those locations are home to over 360,000 refugees.

Upgrading to bitumen
During the 2016 political electoral season, President Yoweri Museveni promised to tarmac this gravel surfaced road, which is in disrepair.

Funding
In September 2020, the World Bank approved a grant of US$130.8 million from the International Development Association (IDA) to tarmac the road. Part of the justification for the grant, is the estimated 800,000 refugees hosted by the districts in the Northern Region of Uganda, especially in the West Nile sub-region. The majority of these refugees come from South Sudan and the Democratic Republic of the Congo.

Construction
Construction is expected to start in 2021, after a contractor is selected and hired.

See also
 List of roads in Uganda
 Transport in Uganda
 Atiak–Adjumani–Moyo–Afoji Road

References

External links
 Uganda National Road Authority Homepage
 UNRA Promises A Better Road Network

Roads in Uganda
Koboko District
Yumbe District
Moyo District
Northern Region, Uganda
West Nile sub-region